Double Line Automatic Signalling is a form of railway signalling used on the majority of double line sections in New Zealand. Double Line Automatic Signalling uses track circuits to detect the presence of trains in sections broken up by intermediate signals. Usually there is an 'up' and a 'down' main line, and beyond station limits the lines are not bi-directionally signalled. DLAS is not designed for wrong-line running in emergency situations.

Junctions or points
At junctions or points, one of or both mains signals are usually controlled either remotely (by a Train Controller or Signalmen) or switched in at a local panel.

Sidings
Sidings off one or both mains are usually operated by switchlock lever points secured by padlock and track circuit presence that enables a release to be given before points can be operated.

Areas of use 
 Papakura - Amokura 
 Te Kauwhata - Hamilton.
 Trentham - Kaiwharawhara
 Kaiwharawhara - South Junction
 North Junction - Waikanae
 Islington - Heathcote

Formerly double line 
 Islington - Rolleston
 Mosgiel - St Leonards

References

Railway signalling
Railway signalling in New Zealand